Arzago d'Adda is a comune (municipality) in the Province of Bergamo in the Italian region of Lombardy, located about  east of Milan and about  southwest of Bergamo.

Arzago d'Adda borders the following municipalities: Agnadello, Calvenzano, Casirate d'Adda, Rivolta d'Adda, Vailate. Sights include remains of a Roman villa from the imperial age, the castle of the marquises de Capitani d'Arzago (turned into a noble residence in the 16th-17th century), the manor Ravajola of the noble family de Sessa and the medieval pieve.

References